Villa Española is a barrio (neighbourhood or district) of Montevideo.

Location
This barrio shares borders with Mercado Modelo to the west, Pérez Castellanos to the northwest, Ituzaingó to the north, Flor de Maroñas to the northeast, Maroñas to the east and Unión to the south.

Sports
Villa Española is home to the C.S.D. Villa Española Boxing and Sports Club.

Places of worship
 Parish Church of the Sacred Heart of Jesus, Vera 2594 (Roman Catholic)
 Parish Church of St. Vincent de Paul, Leopoldo Alas 2940 (Roman Catholic)

See also
Barrios of Montevideo

Barrios of Montevideo